Angaria formosa is a species of sea snail, a marine gastropod mollusk in the family Angariidae.

Description

The shell can grow to be 24 mm to 65 mm in length.

Distribution
Angaria formosa can be found off of the Philippines and Japan.

References

 Reeve, L. A. (1841–1842). Conchologia Systematica, or complete system of conchology; in which the Lepades and conchiferous Mollusca are described and classified according to their natural organization and habits. Longman, Brown, Green, & Longman's, London. [Published in 12 parts in 2 volumes. Dates of publication of individual parts established by Petit 2007, Zootaxa 1648: 43–59].
 Poppe G.T. & Goto Y. (1993) Recent Angariidae. Ancona: Informatore Piceno. 32 pls, 10 pls.
 Monsecour K. & Monsecour D. (2006) The genus Angaria Röding, 1798 (Gastropoda: Turbinidae) in New Caledonia, with description of a new species. Visaya 1(6): 9–16. 
 Williams S.T., Karube S. & Ozawa T. (2008) Molecular systematics of Vetigastropoda: Trochidae, Turbinidae and Trochoidea redefined. Zoologica Scripta 37: 483–506.
 Liu, J.Y. [Ruiyu] (ed.). (2008). Checklist of marine biota of China seas. China Science Press. 1267 pp.
 Günther R. (2016). Angaria neocaledonica n. sp. – A new species of Angariidae from New Caledonia (Mollusca: Gastropoda). Conchylia. 46(1–4): 89–96

External links

Angariidae
Gastropods described in 1843